Nikolai Grigoryevich Sokoloff (28 May 1886 – 25 September 1965) was a Russian-American conductor and violinist.

Biography 
He was born in Kiev, and studied music at Yale. From 1916 to 1917 he was musical director of the San Francisco People's Philharmonic Orchestra, where he insisted on including women in his orchestra and paying them the same salaries as men received. Before being appointed as the first music director of The Cleveland Orchestra, Sokoloff served as a violinist in the Boston Symphony Orchestra and as concertmaster in the Russian Symphony Orchestra, which at the time was based in New York. He played recitals for American troops in Europe during World War I, and later met Adella Prentiss Hughes in New York City, who encouraged him to play a recital in Cleveland in February 1918. After Hughes heard Sokoloff speaking about the need for public school children to be exposed to professional orchestras, she encouraged him to move to Cleveland. At first, his role was to survey music education within Cleveland’s public schools. Soon, however, Hughes and Sokoloff, along with John L. Severance, vice-president of the Musical Arts Association (founded by Hughes in 1915), sought to establish a permanent orchestra in Cleveland.

As a result, the Cleveland Symphony Orchestra (later renamed The Cleveland Orchestra) was formed and the ensemble gave its first concert on December 11, 1918 at Cleveland’s Grays Armory. Sokoloff served as the Orchestra’s music director for another 14 years, until his departure in 1932. During his tenure in Cleveland, Sokoloff expanded both the number of musicians in the Orchestra and the number of programs in its season concert series; he also took the Orchestra on tours across the country. Additionally, Sokoloff led the Orchestra in its first recording project — a 1924 performance of Tchaikovsky’s 1812 Overture, on the Brunswick Label.

In the Orchestra’s second season, the ensemble moved to the Masonic Auditorium, which remained its home until the completion of Severance Hall in 1931. Under Sokoloff’s musical leadership, the city had an established orchestra of its own. Although the end of Sokoloff’s time in Cleveland was spoiled by negative press about his personality, conducting style, and lack of cordiality, he made a point to depart on a positive note. When Sokoloff was asked if he “had anything to say to Cleveland before leaving,” Sokoloff remarked, “Tell them good luck, and that I’ve had a good time."

Between 1935 and 1938 he directed the Federal Music Project, a New Deal program that employed musicians to educate the public about music.  From 1938 to 1941 he directed the Seattle Symphony Orchestra and in 1941 founded the Chamber Music Society (now known as the La Jolla Music Society) in La Jolla, California.

Notable recording premieres 
Rachmaninoff, Symphony No. 2, Cleveland Orchestra, 1928

Bibliography 

Rosenberg, Donald. The Cleveland Orchestra Story: "Second to None." Cleveland: Gray & Company, 2000.

References

External links 

 

1886 births
1965 deaths
Conductors (music) from the Russian Empire
People of the New Deal arts projects
Emigrants from the Russian Empire to the United States